Romance of the Three Kingdoms VIII (三國志VIII) is the eighth installment in Koei's Romance of the Three Kingdoms series.

Power up kit
Power up kit includes following features:

Marriage between generals, which can create offspring for married parties.
New tactical scenario campaign mode. This mode consists of battles and event surrounding Cao Cao, Lu Xun, or Zhuge Liang. The stories change depending on how to win a given scenario.
3 new scenarios added after the death of Zhuge Liang. In addition, there are 60 more generals.
Editor can change data of general and city.
Logs for players activities.
Improved AI.

Power up kit features are not incorporated into PlayStation 2 version of the game.

Reception
On release, Famitsu magazine scored the PlayStation 2 version of the game a 32 out of 40.

References

External links
Japan Gamecity RTK8/RTK8 power up kit page
Taiwan Koei RTK8 page
Taiwan Koei RTK8 power up kit page

2001 video games
Classic Mac OS games
PlayStation 2 games
PlayStation Portable games
Windows games
8
Turn-based strategy video games
Grand strategy video games
Video games developed in Japan